Thikamporn Ritta-apinan (nicknamed "Cheer", ; born 12 August 1987 in Bangkok) is a Thai actress. She starred in several television shows of Thai Channel 7.

Early life and education
Cheer is 170 centimeters tall and weighs 53 kilograms. She has three brothers. After graduating from Secondary 4 at Sueksa Naree School, she entered the entertainment world by winning the 2002 Miss Teen Thailand competition.

She studied at the Faculty of Social Administration of Thammasat University. In the aftermath of the controversial punishment of fellow TU student Chotiros Suriyawong for wearing a sexy black dress at the 2007 Subhanahongsa Awards, Tikamporn was chosen by University Assistant Rector for Student Affairs Prinya Thewanaruemitkul as the presenter of an official university campaign to urge students not to dress in a sexy manner.

In 2015, Cheer did not renew her contract with Channel 7. She decides to go freelance. The first lakorn she starred in since she became a freelance was "The Cupid Series" for Channel 3.

Personal life
On June 28, 2019, Cheer admits that she is in a relationship with a non-celebrity guy named Big or Hiso Big Thanaphol Benjarongkakul, son of a Billionaire Boonchai Benjarongkakul.

Work

Film

Television series

Host show / MC / DJ

Theater

Discography

Soundtracks

References

1987 births
Living people
Thikamporn Ritta-apinan
Thikamporn Ritta-apinan
Thikamporn Ritta-apinan
Thikamporn Ritta-apinan
Thikamporn Ritta-apinan
Thikamporn Ritta-apinan
Thikamporn Ritta-apinan
Miss Teen Thailand